SWsoft was a privately held server automation and virtualization software company and the parent company of Parallels. SWsoft developed software for running data centers, particularly for web-hosting services companies, application service providers, and managed service providers. SWsoft products included applications for operating system-level virtualization, which enables users to run multiple operating systems, including Windows, Mac OS X, Linux, and Solaris, on a single computer.

The company was founded in 1997 and maintained its headquarters in Herndon, Virginia, with additional offices throughout North America, Europe, and Asia. Its research and development offices were located in Moscow, Russia, and it had sales offices in Germany and Singapore.

In December 2007, SWsoft announced its plans to change its name to Parallels in 2008 and ship its products under the Parallels brand name.

Company history

 1997  SWsoft founded
 2001
 Virtuozzo released
 HSPcomplete released
 2003
 SWsoft acquires automation firms Yippi-Yeah! E-Business GmbH (makers of Confixx) and Plesk Inc (makers of Confixx and Plesk)
 PEM datacenter released
 Open Fusion launched
 2004
 Announces partnership with Acronis
 Plesk 7.0 released
 SiteBuilder beta released
 Acquires Parallels, Inc.  but keeps this secret.
 2007  December 12: SWsoft announces that it will change its name to "Parallels" in 2008.
 2007  December: SWsoft acquires WebHostAutomation Ltd developers of HELM Control Panel.
 January 2008  SWsoft officially becomes Parallels, Inc.

Uses
SWsoft’s virtualization software is predominantly used to automate data center and server management and to consolidate multiple servers onto one Windows- or Linux-based physical server. The company’s products are developed predominantly for web hosting companies, service providers, and corporations.

Although the company’s software reportedly uses fewer system resources because it does not require each virtualized server to have an independent operating system, its overall flexibility is limited. For example, each virtualized Virtuozzo server must have the same version of the same operating system, and when running Linux, the operating systems' kernel must be modified from the standard version.

References

Software companies established in 1997
Virtualization software
Software companies based in Virginia
Privately held companies based in Virginia
Defunct software companies of the United States